("Indies Neighborhood") is a neighborhood in the borough of Oost, the eastern part of the city of Amsterdam, Netherlands. The name of the neighborhood dates from the early 20th century, and is derived from the fact that the neighborhood's streets are named after islands and other geographical concepts in the former Dutch colony of the Dutch East Indies or now known as Indonesia. The first street was named in 1902.

In 2003, the neighborhood had around 23,000 inhabitants. The neighborhood is bounded on the west by the railroad Amsterdam - Hilversum (with the Muiderpoort Station), on the east side by Flevopark, on the north side by Zeeburgerdijk and on the south side by the Ringvaart Watergraafsmeer.

Indische Buurt is the oldest part of the former Zeeburg district and is very ethnically diverse. A high percentage of the population is of immigrant origin (for Zeeburg this is already high at 55%, but higher in the Indische Buurt) and there are an estimated 100 languages spoken.

History
The impetus was given to create a new residential area in the early 20th century, as Amsterdam had previously experienced large population growth. The construction of the area was well under way on the wave of economic growth that followed the completion of the North Sea Canal in 1876 and the commissioning of the Merwedekanaal in 1892. In May 1915, the tram route 14 was extended into Indische Buurt.

The growth continued for some time, with an interruption in the 1930s as a result of the Great Depression. Indische Buurt was relatively isolated from the rest of the city by its position behind the railway line that runs through the area, and connects Amsterdam Centraal with Utrecht, until 1939 when Muiderpoort Station was built.

One of the last bath houses in Amsterdam was built on Javaplein in 1942, which functioned until 1982.

From the 1960s the Amsterdam seaport moved to the west of the city and the neighborhood became a purely residential area.

Redevelopment

Since the mid-1990s the area has been undergoing rapid gentrification as formerly squatted buildings, as well as former student housing, are being renovated and sold. Timorplein is a particular area of focus for the area's urban gentrification, and the square's renewal was completed in 2010 with the opening of a new cultural institution which includes Studio K, housing a theater and restaurant, a new 'Stayokay' hostel, and the IIRE, which includes meeting and conference rooms. Another redevelopment project is 'Pompstation', near the Zeeburgerdijk tram stop, a restaurant and cafe located in a former industrial building. In addition, one of the neighborhoods's major thoroughfares, the Javastraat, has been transformed into a new Mediterranean-style shopping area which included the repaving of streets and improved bicycle parking. In 2010, the Borneohof building was constructed on the Javaplein, which houses a large library of Amsterdam, restaurants like Het Badhuis en de Wilde Zwijnen and the gym Akademia Training.

Public transport
Amsterdam Muiderpoort railway station is situated in the west of Indische Buurt on the border with Watergraafsmeer. Trains to Amsterdam, Schiphol, Rotterdam, Utrecht / Rhenen and Amersfoort call at Muiderpoort.

Tram routes 1, 3 and 14 have their terminus in Indische Buurt. Route 1 has its terminus at the Muiderpoort Station, and routes 3 and 14 at Flevopark. Bus routes 22, 40, 41 all have a terminus at Muiderpoort Station. In addition, bus lines 37, and 65 run through Indische Buurt.

Areas 
Within Indische Buurt, several smaller areas are recognized: Ambonbuurt, Makassarbuurt, Sumatrabuurt and Timorbuurt.

Ambonbuurt 
Ambonbuurt (Ambon neighborhood) is a densely populated residential area bounded by the Insulindeweg, Molukkenstraat, Valentijnkade and the railway line. The neighborhood has the second highest population density of the neighborhood after the neighboring Sumatrabuurt. The population in 2010 was approximately 4,000 people in an area of 16 hectares.

Makassarbuurt 
Makassarbuurt (Makassar neighborhood) is primarily a residential neighborhood which lies in between Zeeburgerdijk, Molukkenstraat, Insulindeweg and Flevopark. The area covers 115 hectares, of which more than half is park and water. The area is densely populated and has 6,618 residents as at early 2010. The neighborhood's shopping areas include Molukkenstraat and the commercial zone around Zeeburgerdijk.

Flevopark

On the east side of Indische Buurt is Flevopark, which includes the outdoor Flevopark swimming pools. This park was planned in 1908 by naturalist Jac. P. Thijsse, who envisioned a park between the Jewish Cemetery and the Nieuwe Diep. The expropriation procedure began in 1914, and from 1921 there was money available to obtain the land suitable for building the park. In 1928, the construction of the park began.

Flevopark includes the site of a Jewish cemetery. It was in use since 1714 by the Jewish Community, and there are an estimated 200,000 people buried there. It has not been in active use anymore since 1942.

Sumatrabuurt 

Sumatrabuurt (The Sumatra Area) lies between Insulindeweg, Molukkenstraat and Valentijnkade. It is the most densely populated of all neighborhoods in the borough of Amsterdam-Oost. In 2010, about 3,000 people lived on an area of 14 hectares. A commercial area lies on the west side along Molukkenstraat.

Timorbuurt 

Timorbuurt lies between Zeeburgerdijk, Molukkenstraat, Insulindeweg and Celebesstraat. It is densely populated: the population in 2010 was approximately 8,000, giving a population density of 14,837 per km². There are no parks in the area. The area contains the Timorplein, a cultural spot. Mostly a residential neighborhood, it contains the Javastraat, the Indische Buurt's most important shopping street.

References

External links

Neighbourhoods of Amsterdam
Amsterdam-Oost